Charles Edward Manoharan "Mano" Ponniah (born 3 May 1943 in Kalutara, Ceylon) is a Sri Lankan architect and engineer who played first-class cricket in Sri Lanka and England from 1964 to 1969.

Cricket career in Ceylon
Mano Ponniah attended S. Thomas' College, Mount Lavinia, before studying engineering at the University of Ceylon. He was a member of the University team that won the P. Saravanamuttu Trophy in 1963.

He played for Ceylon as an opening batsman while still a student, making his first-class debut in the Gopalan Trophy match against Madras in 1963-64, when in 76.1 overs in the second innings he made 60 not out, Ceylon's highest score of the match, to help Ceylon to victory by six wickets. He toured India with Ceylon in 1964-65, playing in seven of the eight first-class matches and scoring 325 runs at an average of 25.00. He played in all three matches against India.

Cricket career in England
In 1966, he went to Emmanuel College, Cambridge to continue his studies. He played for Cambridge University from 1967 to 1969. His best season was 1967, when in 13 matches he scored 800 runs at an average of 36.36. His highest score in 1967 was 98 not out against Middlesex, when he opened the innings and added 194 for the second wicket with Roger Knight.

He was selected to tour England with the Ceylon team in 1968, but the tour was cancelled just before it was due to begin. In 1968, Cambridge won no matches, and "despite a rather limited range of strokes" Ponniah scored their only century. In the match against Lancashire, he made 101 not out in the first innings and 67 in the second, while his team-mates made only 93 and 63 respectively. In his last match, against Oxford University in 1969, he made 27 and 50 not out, sharing an unbroken third-wicket partnership of 123 in 92 minutes with Knight.

Architecture career
Ponniah worked in England until 1990, when he returned to Sri Lanka and founded the Colombo architectural firm Mano Ponniah & Associates. The firm has won several awards, including one for an ocean resort in the Maldives.

He and his wife Radhika, whom he married in 1971, have two sons.

References

External links
 Mano Ponniah at CricketArchive
 Luck played a big part in Ponniah's career
 Mano Ponniah – Concrete Defence
 Mano Ponniah & Associates

1943 births
Living people
Sri Lankan cricketers
All-Ceylon cricketers
Cambridge University cricketers
Alumni of S. Thomas' College, Mount Lavinia
Alumni of the University of Ceylon (Colombo)
Alumni of Emmanuel College, Cambridge
Sri Lankan Tamil architects
People from Kalutara
Sri Lankan Tamil sportspeople
Oxford and Cambridge Universities cricketers
20th-century Sri Lankan architects
21st-century Sri Lankan architects